John Hugya (born  1934
) is a former Marine and aide to Congressman John Murtha. Hugya ran for Congress in Pennsylvania's 12th congressional district in the 2014 elections. He is a member of the Democratic Party.

Personal life and education
Hugya is married to Karen Hugya, with whom he has one child, and another from a previous marriage. Hugya attended college on the GI Bill.

Career
Hugya met John Murtha in 1959 when Hugya was a platoon sergeant and Murtha was a unit commander. Hugya worked for Murtha's first campaign in 1967, and worked for him in every subsequent campaign. Hugya would serve in the Marines until 1992, achieving the rank of colonel.

In 2009, Hugya used campaign money to buy a rifle at an NRA meeting. In that same year, Murtha's Republican challenger, Bill Russell, accused Hugya of threatening to have Russell recalled to active Army duty.

Hugya worked in the Pennsylvania steel industry. Hugya was also a police officer for Somerset County, Pennsylvania, and served as the assistant director of the Johnstown Regional Police Academy. He currently runs a shooting range with his wife.

2014 Congressional candidacy
Hugya ran for Congress in Pennsylvania's 12th congressional district in the 2014 elections. The seat is held by Republican Keith Rothfus. Hugya's candidacy was endorsed by former Senator Bob Kerrey (D-NE) and retired generals Wesley Clark and Hugh Shelton. He lost in the Democratic primary, to psychologist and businesswoman Erin McClelland, by 68% to 32%.

References

External links
Facebook profile

Living people
Pennsylvania Democrats
Year of birth uncertain
Year of birth missing (living people)